Lemyra kannegieteri is a moth of the family Erebidae first described by Walter Rothschild in 1910. It is found on Nias, an island located off the western coast of Sumatra, Indonesia.

References

Moths described in 1910
kannegieteri